Imbersago is a comune (municipality) in the Province of Lecco in the Italian region Lombardy, located in the Brianza traditional area about  northeast of Milan and about  south of Lecco.

Imbersago is situated on the Adda River and borders the following municipalities: Calco, Merate, Robbiate, Villa d'Adda.

History 
There are no known archaeological finds for the Imbersago area. In the surrounding area, however, human frequentations are known starting from the middle Paleolithic. In the area the Celts took over the pile-dwelling settlements, subjected in turn by the Romans.

The medieval history of Imbersago sees the town lined up in favor of the Guelphs, and as a point of contact between the area of Milan and the Republic of Venice.

Society

Languages and dialects 
In addition to the Italian language, in Imbersago is also used the local Brianza dialect, a variant of the Lombard language. Like all western Lombard dialects, local Brianza dialect is also substantially a Romance language derived from Latin. 

Currently, the use of this dialect is slowly regressing, although to a lesser extent than other Lombard dialects, especially those spoken in the cities.

Religion 
Most of the population, as in all of Italy, belongs to the Catholic Church, and belongs to the three churches located in the parish: the church of San Marcellino, the church of San Paolo, and the Sanctuary of Madonna del Bosco. All three churches belong to the Archdiocese of Milan and follow the Ambrosian rite.

Culture

Imbersago in literature 
Emilio De Marchi set his work Giacomo l’idealista in Imbersago, and could not help but mention the Sanctuary providing a fairly accurate description. A film of the same name was made from the book in 1948, directed by Alberto Lattuada and interpreted by Marina Berti. Luigi Santucci also talked about it in his book Brianza ed altri amori. 

Impossible to forget I promessi sposi, written by Alessandro Manzoni, who cross the Adda in Imbersago.

Ermanno Olmi's film E venne un uomo, centered on the figure of Pope Giovanni XXIII, was shot in part in Imbersago, and to be precise in the Garavesa area and at the Sanctuary.

Main sights
Santi Marcellino e Pietro, main church of town 
Sanctuary of Madonna del Bosco, 17th century Marian shrine
The Leonardo's ferry, connecting Imbersago to Villa d'Adda. It takes its name from the Florentine artist and inventor, who studied a similar project during his service under Ludovico il Moro, lord of Milan, and who sojourned at Vaprio d'Adda in 1506–07.
Torre Bellavista, a medieval watchtower (14th century)
San Paolo -church in town center with 16th-century altarpiece

Twin towns
 Pont-Évêque, France, since 2003

References

External links
 Official website

Cities and towns in Lombardy